Gloster may refer to:

People with the surname 
 Elizabeth Gloster (born 1949), English judge
 J. Gary Gloster (born 1936), American bishop in The Episcopal Church
 John Gloster (born before 1998), Australian physiotherapist who works with cricket teams
 Tracey Gloster, British biochemist

People with the given name 
 Gloster Richardson (born 1942), American football player
 Gloster Udy (19182003), Australian Uniting Church minister and author

Places 
 Actis, California (formerly Highberg, Rummington, and Gloster), an unincorporated community in Kern County
 Gloster, Georgia, an unincorporated community
 Gloster, Louisiana, an unincorporated community and census-designated place in DeSoto Parish
 Gloster, Mississippi, a town in Amite County
 Gloster River, in the Marlborough region of New Zealand

Other uses 
 Gloster Aircraft Company, British aircraft manufacturer 191763
 :Category:Gloster aircraft
 Gloster Southern Railroad, in Mississippi and Louisiana
 Gloster, an apple cultivar
 MG Gloster, a sport utility vehicle sold by SAIC Motor in India

See also 

 "The Mary Gloster", an 1890s poem by Rudyard Kipling
 Gloucester (disambiguation)